Gerhard Tausche (born 1957) is a German archivist and author.

He is head of the Stadtarchivs Landshut and chairman of the Historischen Vereins Niederbayern.

Works
Landshut, die altbayerische Residenzstadt an der Isar. Landshut 1999. , Verwandlungen. 2001.Geschichte Landshuts. Mit Werner Ebermaier. ünchen 2003. Von der Donau an die Isar. Vorlesungen zur Geschichte der Ludwig-Maximilians-Universität 1800–1826 in Landshut. edited by Latitia Boehm & Gerhard Tausche. Berlin 2003. 
Reinhard Stauber, Gerhard Tausche and Richard Loibl: Niederbayerns reiche Herzöge. (Hefte zur bayerischen Geschichte und Kultur, Bd. 38). Augsburg 2009.

References

German archivists

People from Landshut
1957 births
Living people
German male writers